William Robert Nelson Buck Blair was a Canadian psychologist and academic administrator.

Career
Blair received a BA and MA in psychology from the University of Alberta. During World War II, he enlisted in the Canadian army and for a period served as a gunner lieutenant. He then moved to the army's Directorate of Personnel Selection and during the 1950s worked in the Canadian Army Personnel System. He returned to academia and obtained a PhD from the University of Ottawa in 1956. He then joined the faculty at the University of Calgary where he was Head of the Department of Psychology from 1966 to 1974 and associate vice-president (academic) of the university from 1974 to 1978. He retired in 1980.

He served extensively on national, regional and international organizations of psychology.

Positions
 1966: President, Canadian Psychological Association

Awards
 1989 - Honorary Doctor of Military Science, Royal Roads Military College

References

Year of birth missing
Year of death missing
20th-century Canadian psychologists
Canadian military personnel of World War II
Canadian psychologists
University of Alberta alumni
Academic staff of the University of Calgary
Presidents of the Canadian Psychological Association